The Red Line is the first section in operation of the tram system in Jerusalem, known as the Jerusalem Light Rail. It became fully operational on December 1, 2011. Extensions to the red line are currently under construction to the northern suburb of Neve Yaakov and to Hadassah Ein Kerem Hospital to the southwest.

With a total estimated cost for the initial section of the line of 3.8 billion NIS (approx. US $1.1 billion), the project was criticized for budget overruns, for its route serving Jewish neighborhoods in east Jerusalem and for contributing to air and noise pollution during construction.

Stations

Future

Initial extensions to the Red Line were planned to the neighborhoods of Neve Yaakov in Northeast Jerusalem and Ein Karem (near Hadassah Hospital) in the Southwest.  Former mayor Uri Lupolianski stated that they would be completed at the same time as the rest of the line. In 2008, French company Egis Rail won an 11.9 million Euro contract to carry out some of the design work. However, in March 2009, CityPass turned down implementing the project. In May 2010 the Jerusalem Municipality announced that the extensions would be built by the state authorities rather than a private company. The extension to Hadassah Hospital from Mount Herzl is particularly challenging and will involve a complex path with complicated bridging works. As of summer 2012, while works on the extension have not begun, the line's final terminal station, next to Hadassah's new inpatient building is nevertheless being built during the construction of the inpatient building – in order not to disrupt hospital operations later after the new building will be completed. Also planned are branches to the Red Line that would create a "campus line" connecting the Mount Scopus and Givat Ram campuses of the Hebrew University.

See also
Tel Aviv Light Rail
Jerusalem Light Rail

References 

Railway lines opened in 2011
2011 establishments in Israel
Transport in Jerusalem
East Jerusalem
750 V DC railway electrification